First Congregational Church (also called the Community Congregational Church) is a historic church at 101 Pawnee Avenue in Manitou Springs, Colorado.  Completed in August 1880, it was the first church built in Manitou Springs and is the oldest continuously operated Congregational church in Colorado. Due to an influx of tourists during the summer, it was enlarged in 1891. It was added to the National Register of Historic Places in 1979.

References

External links
 

Churches on the National Register of Historic Places in Colorado
Gothic Revival church buildings in Colorado
Churches completed in 1880
Churches in El Paso County, Colorado
Manitou Springs, Colorado
National Register of Historic Places in El Paso County, Colorado
1880 establishments in Colorado
Churches in Colorado